"Song of India" is a popular song adapted from the aria "Pesni︠a︡ indiĭskogo gosti︠a︡" (Song of the Indian Guest) from Rimsky-Korsakov's 1896 opera Sadko.  The melody was also used for the 1918 song "Beautiful Ohio", which became the official song of the U.S. State of Ohio.

Tommy Dorsey recording
In January 1937, Tommy Dorsey recorded an instrumental jazz arrangement featuring Bunny Berigan on trumpet, which became a jazz standard. Coupled with "Marie", the 78 rpm disc (Victor #25523) was a major hit for Dorsey, containing two of his most enduring recordings on one record, and which helped make him and his band into a household name as a popular music artist in the United States.

Other recordings
Paul Whiteman also recorded a foxtrot arrangement of the song in 1921. 
Another recording was Danny Gatton's Redneck Jazz Explosion in 1978.
Sarah Brightman, on her 2013 album Dreamchaser.

References

1921 singles
1937 songs
1930s jazz standards
Jazz compositions in F major
Swing jazz standards
Songs about India